Tim Eichenberg (born 1951) is an American politician from the state of New Mexico. A member of the Democratic Party, he served as the state treasurer of New Mexico.

Early life and education 
Eichenberg was raised in Albuquerque, New Mexico. He attended Albuquerque Public Schools and was graduated from the University of New Mexico.

Career
Eichenberg began his career as a real estate broker and property tax consultant for New Mexico Property Tax Consultants in Albuquerque, New Mexico.

Eichenberg was elected as the treasurer for Bernalillo County, New Mexico, in 1974. He served for two terms and was re-elected in 1976. In 2004, Eichenberg served as the property tax director for the New Mexico Taxation and Revenue Department during the tenure of Bill Richardson. In his position, he supervised the work of all New Mexico county assessors.

Eichenberg was elected to the New Mexico Senate in 2008 and assumed office in January 2009. During his tenure, he served on the public affairs and judiciary committees. In 2010, Eichenberg carried the NM Governmental Conduct Act, establishing a code of ethics for all state government employees. Though he initially filed to run for re-election in 2012, he withdrew from the race on June 5, 2012.

Eichenberg was elected as 30th state treasurer of New Mexico in 2014. He was re-elected in 2018.

Personal life 

Eichenberg and his wife, Sandra, have two adult children. He is a member of the Knights of Columbus and has served on the boards for the National Kidney Foundation and the Arthritis Foundation.

In 1994, Eichenberg was charged with a misdemeanor for illegally carrying a firearm in his carry-on luggage while attempting to board a plane in Austin, Texas.

Electoral history

References

External links
 Government website

|-

1950s births
21st-century American politicians
County officials in New Mexico
Living people
Democratic Party New Mexico state senators
Politicians from Albuquerque, New Mexico
State treasurers of New Mexico
University of New Mexico alumni